The 2017 U-19 Asia Rugby Championship is an international rugby union competition for Under 20 national teams in Asia. The winners will secure a berth at the 2018 World Rugby Under 20 Trophy.

Top division
The top division will be hosted in Sri Lanka and Hong Kong on 10 and 16 December 2017 respectively. It will be played over two legs.

Matches

Division 1
Division 1 matches will be held by the Philippines at the International School Manila in Taguig from 13–16 December 2017.

Matches

Semi-finals

3rd place playoff

Final

References

2017 rugby union tournaments for national teams
rugby union
2017 in Asian rugby union
Asia Rugby Championship